Eduardo Raúl Flores (23 April 1944 – 20 January 2022) was an Argentine footballer who played as a striker for Estudiantes de La Plata in Argentina and AS Nancy in France.

Career
Flores started his playing career in 1962 with Estudiantes de La Plata, he went on to make 165 league appearances for the club scoring 65 goals. He was part of Osvaldo Zubeldía's team that won the 1967 Metropolitano championship, followed by three successive Copa Libertadores titles from 1968 to 1970.

Flores missed the 1968 Copa Intercontinental championship win against Manchester United (of the Premier League), but played on the losing side against AC Milan in the 1969 edition and Feyenoord in 1970.

In 1972, Flores joined French team AS Nancy where he played out the remainder of his career.

Personal life and death
Flores died from cancer on 20 January 2022, at the age of 77.

Honours
Estudiantes
 Argentine Primera División: 1967 Metropolitano
 Copa Libertadores: 1968, 1969, 1970
 Copa Interamericana: 1969

References

1944 births
2022 deaths
Sportspeople from Buenos Aires Province
Argentine footballers
Association football forwards
Estudiantes de La Plata footballers
AS Nancy Lorraine players
Copa Libertadores-winning players
Argentine Primera División players
Ligue 1 players
Argentine expatriate footballers
Argentine expatriate sportspeople in France
Expatriate footballers in France